Betaab (Restless) is a 1983 Indian romance film written by Javed Akhtar, directed by Rahul Rawail and produced by Bikram Singh Dehal. The film stars Sunny Deol and Amrita Singh in their debut roles along with Shammi Kapoor. The music was composed by Rahul Dev Burman. The film went on to be one of the biggest hits of the year. The film was remade in Telugu as Samrat in 1987, with Ramesh Babu and Sonam, and in Kannada as Karthik in 2011.

Plot
This film is a love story of two youngsters who fall in love despite the status gaps between their families. Sunny, is a young, poor and happy guy who lives with his mother Sumitra in his home-made town farm. Formerly, his father Avenash had been a big businessman, but he went bankrupt. For this reason, he killed himself. Avenash was close friends with Sardar Dinesh Singh Girji who is one of the richest and most powerful men in the city. When Sardar reveals that Avenash has gone bankrupt, he turns his back to him. Sardar has one daughter called Roma. She is spoiled, snobbish and accustomed to having all the people who surround her beneath her. She was Sunny's childhood friend.

Now, Sardar purchases a new horse farm out of the city in the town, which is nearby Sunny's farm. When Sunny accompanies his mother to the train station, he encounters Roma after not seeing her for years. Sunny instantly recognizes her, but Roma doesn't. Consequently, they coincidentally meet each other various times on the farm. They quarrel continually, but soon she realises that he is her childhood friend and they reconstruct their childhood love.

Cast 
 Sunny Deol as Sunny Kapoor
 Amrita Singh as Roma Singh Girji
 Shammi Kapoor as Roma's father, Sardar Dinesh Singh Girji
 Nirupa Roy as Sumitra Devi, Sunny's mother
 Rajeev Anand as Yashwant, proposed fiance for Roma
 Prem Chopra as Balwant, Yashwant's father
 Annu Kapoor as Chela Ram, servant
 Rehana
 Birbal as Gangaram
 Sonu Nigam as the young Sunny (child artist)

Music 
The movie has five popular songs of its lyricist by Anand Bakshi and sung by Lata Mangeshkar and Shabbir Kumar, composed by R. D. Burman:

Awards

 31st Filmfare Awards:

Nominated

 Best Film – Vijeta Films
 Best Director – Rahul Rawail
 Best Actor – Sunny Deol
 Best Music Director – R. D. Burman
 Best Lyricist – Anand Bakshi for "Jab Hum Jawaan Honge"
 Best Male Playback Singer – Shabbir Kumar for "Jab Hum Jawaan Honge"
 Best Male Playback Singer – Shabbir Kumar for "Parbaton Se Aaj"
 Best Story – Javed Akhtar

References

External links

1983 films
1980s Hindi-language films
Indian romantic musical films
Films scored by R. D. Burman
Films directed by Rahul Rawail
Hindi films remade in other languages
Urdu films remade in other languages
1980s Urdu-language films
Vijayta Films films
1980s romantic musical films
Films about dogs
Films about pets
Urdu-language Indian films